Dichomeris polypunctata is a moth in the family Gelechiidae. It was described by Kyu-Tek Park in 1994. It is found in south-eastern Siberia, Korea and Mongolia.

The length of the forewings is about 10.5 mm. The forewings are yellowish orange with dark fuscous scales at the base and two pairs of dark brown spots at the middle and at the end of the cell. There are several irregular dark spots along the termen. The hindwings are grey, but darker towards the termen.

References

Moths described in 1994
polypunctata